Big Hero 6 may refer to:

 Big Hero 6 (comics), a team of superheroes appearing in IDW and Marvel Comics
 Big Hero 6 (film), a 2014 computer-animated superhero film based on the comics characters
 Big Hero 6: The Series, an animated series based on the 2014 film Big Hero 6
 List of Big Hero 6: The Series episodes, list of the episodes of the TV series